An Unusual Summer is a 1957 Soviet drama film directed by Vladimir Basov.

Plot 
The film takes place in 1919 in Saratov. Student Kirill Izvekov becomes Commissioner of the Red Army and participates in the battle with Wrangel and the capture of the city.

Cast 
 Viktor Korshunov as Kirill Izvekov
 Roza Makagonova as Anochka
 Vladimir Yemelyanov as Ragosyn
 Mikhail Nazvanov as Pastukhov
 Yury Yakovlev as Dybych
 Yevgeny Teterin as Dorogomilov
 Vladimir Druzhnikov as Tsvetukhin
 Georgi Georgiu as Oznobishin
 Afanasi Kochetkov as sailor Strashnov
 Tatyana Konyukhova as Liza Meshkova
 Nikolai Kryukov as chairman
 Boris Novikov as Viktor Shubnikov
 Gleb Strizhenov as Ipat Ipatiev
 Valentina Ushakova as Asya Pastukhova
 Olga Zhiznyeva as Vera Izvekova

Release
Vladimir Basov's film was watched by 21.9 million viewers, which is the 815th place in the entire history of the Soviet film distribution.

References

External links 
 

1957 films
1950s Russian-language films
Soviet drama films
1957 drama films
Mosfilm films
Russian Civil War films
Films directed by Vladimir Basov
Films based on Russian novels
Films set in 1919